The 2007–08 Maltese Premier League (known as the BOV Premier League for sponsorship reasons) was the 28th season of the Maltese Premier League, and the 93rd season of top-level league football in Malta. Valletta won their nineteenth league title overcoming last season's champions, Marsaxlokk.

Teams 

The following teams were promoted from the First Division at the start of the season:
 Mqabba
 Ħamrun Spartans

From the previous Premier League season, the following teams were relegated to the First Division:
 St. George's
 Marsa

First phase

League table

Results

Second phase

Top Six 

The teams placed in the first six positions in the league table qualified for the Top Six, and the points obtained during the first phase were halved (and rounded up) before the start of second phase. As a result, the teams started with the following points before the second phase: Valletta 18 points, Marsaxlokk 16, Sliema Wanderers 16, Floriana 14, Birkirkara 13 and Ħamrun Spartans 13.

Play-out 

The teams which finished in the last four league positions were placed in the play-out and at the end of the phase the two lowest-placed teams were relegated to the First Division. The points obtained during the first phase were halved (and rounded up) before the start of second phase. As a result, the teams started with the following points before the second phase: Hibernians 12 points, Msida Saint-Joseph 10, Pietà Hotspurs 7, Mqabba 3.

Season statistics

Top scorers

Hat-tricks

Awards

Monthly awards

Annual awards 

Winners are listed first and highlighted in boldface.

References

External links 
 Official website

Maltese Premier League seasons
Malta
1